Elin Alberte Leonora Winding (born 23 August 1963), commonly known as Alberte, is a Danish singer and actress, and the daughter of Thomas Winding and Lulu Gauguin.  She grew up in Copenhagen and on the island of Ærø. She worked together with her brothers Kasper Winding and Aske Bentzon on their father's programs for Denmark Radio.

Alberte is well known for her appearance as Luna in several episodes of the Danish children's television show Bamses billedbog. She also played Lis in the film Strømer and has acted in several plays. Winding was married to musician Jan Rørdam for nearly 20 years, and made and played much of her music with him, but they divorced in 2001.

The world-famous painter Paul Gauguin is her great-grandfather.

Discography

Albums 
1985: Alberte
1986: Lige På 
1991: Lyse Nætter
1992: Det Skaldede Spøgelse
1993: Den Forsvundne Skat
1994: Tju Bang Chokolademand
1996: Alle Verdens Hjørner
1999: Brænder Sol
1999: De Største & De Mindste
2002: Alberte Winding/Benjamin Koppel (jointly with Benjamin Koppel)
2003: Svenske Spor (credited as Alberte) 
2005: Sludder og Vrøvl Gamle Jas (with Thomas Winding & Jan Rørdam)
2008: Frostmorgen (with Benjamin Koppel) 
2011: Fjerde til venstre
2012: Ønskescenariet
2015: Kommer hjem

Compilation albums 
1999: Grænseløs Greatest
2011: Albertes Bedste Børnesange (credited as Alberte)

Singles
Featured in
2011: "Min Klub Først" (Rosa Lux feat. Alberte) (#1 in Danish Singles Chart)

References

External links 
 
 

1963 births
Living people
20th-century Danish women singers
21st-century Danish women singers
Danish people of French descent
Singers from Copenhagen